Minkkinen is a Finnish surname. Notable people with the surname include:

 Jaakko Minkkinen (born 1933), Finnish sports shooter
 Arno Rafael Minkkinen (born 1945), Finnish photographer 
 Mikko Minkkinen (born 1984), Finnish figure skater
 Suvi Minkkinen (born 1994), Finnish biathlete

Finnish-language surnames